Robert Thomson Melrose (22 April 1862 – 26 April 1945) was a pastoralist and politician in South Australia.

History
Melrose's parents George Melrose (22 December 1806 – 8 April 1894) and Euphemia, née Thomson, (died 1887) left Balerno, Scotland, on the Palmyra, arriving in 1839. George established a sheep run at Macclesfield with (later Sir) Walter W. Hughes, later settled at Mount Pleasant.

He was a director of Elder, Smith & Co., Ltd., and from 1917 until his death was a longtime member of the Stockowners' Association and the Agricultural and Horticultural Society and its president 1919–1920.

He was chairman of the Anti-Cancer Campaign at the Adelaide University and on the board of the Adelaide Botanic Garden.

He was a keen golfer.

Politics
Melrose was a member of the Legislative Council from 1921 to 1927.

Family
Robert T. Melrose was a second generation member of a large and influential South Australian family founded by George Melrose.

He was married, leaving a widow, Gwendoline Grace Melrose (1908–1991). They had no children.

References 

Australian pastoralists
Australian sheep breeders
Members of the South Australian Legislative Council
1862 births
1945 deaths